John Stuart Bain (born 12 October 1955) was the Archdeacon of Sunderland from 2002 until 2018.

Early life
White was educated at Van Mildert College, Durham and trained for ordination at Westcott House, Cambridge.

Ordained ministry
Bain was ordained in 1981 and served curacies in  Washington and Dunston. He was Area Dean of Auckland from 1996 to 2002; was made an Honorary Canon of Durham Cathedral from 1998 to 2002; and Archdeacon of Sunderland in 2002.

Personal life
Bain married  Angela Forster in 1978: they have two sons and one daughter.

Stuart was the father of video game commentator John Bain (TotalBiscuit)

Styles
The Reverend Stuart Bain(1981–2002; 2018–present)
The Venerable Stuart Bain (2002–2018)

References

1955 births
Living people
Alumni of Van Mildert College, Durham
Alumni of Westcott House, Cambridge
Archdeacons of Sunderland